The 2021 season saw Western Storm compete in the 50 over Rachael Heyhoe Flint Trophy and the new Twenty20 competition, the Charlotte Edwards Cup. The side finished sixth in the Rachael Heyhoe Flint Trophy, with 3 wins from their 7 matches. In the Charlotte Edwards Cup, the side finished second in Group B, narrowly missing out on progressing to Finals Day.
 
The side was captained by Sophie Luff and coached by Mark O'Leary. They played three home matches at the County Ground, Bristol, three at the County Ground, Taunton and one, a first for the side, at Sophia Gardens.

Squad
Western Storm announced their initial 18-player squad for the season on 27 May 2021. Claire Nicholas re-joined the squad on 25 August 2021 after being on maternity leave. Chloe Skelton and Joleigh Roberts were promoted to the senior squad from the Academy during the season, both playing their first match on 10 September 2021. Age given is at the start of Western Storm's first match of the season (29 May 2021).

Rachael Heyhoe Flint Trophy

Season standings

 Advanced to the final
 Advanced to the play-off

Fixtures

Tournament statistics

Batting

Source: ESPN Cricinfo Qualification: 100 runs.

Bowling

Source: ESPN Cricinfo Qualification: 5 wickets.

Charlotte Edwards Cup

Group B

 Advanced to the semi-final

Fixtures

Tournament statistics

Batting

Source: ESPN Cricinfo Qualification: 50 runs.

Bowling

Source: ESPN Cricinfo Qualification: 5 wickets.

Season statistics

Batting

Bowling

Fielding

Wicket-keeping

References

Western Storm seasons
2021 in English women's cricket